This is a list of selected Australian islands grouped by State or Territory. Australia has 8,222 islands within its maritime borders.

Largest islands

 Tasmania (Tas) ;
 Melville Island, Northern Territory (NT), ;
 Kangaroo Island, South Australia (SA), ;
 Groote Eylandt (NT), ;
 Bathurst Island (NT), ;
 Fraser Island, Queensland (Qld), ;
 Flinders Island (Tas), ;
 King Island (Tas), ; and
 Mornington Island (Qld), .

New South Wales

 Amherst Island, in Lake Mummuga
 Bare Island, near the north headland of Botany Bay
 Belowla Island, off Kioloa Beach
 Boondelbah Island, at the mouth of Port Stephens
 Brisbane Water:
 Pelican Island
 Riley's Island
 St Hubert's Island (largely artificial, created by raising an inter-tidal wetland above high water level)
 Broughton Island, located north of Port Stephens
 Broulee Island, located off the coast at Broulee
 Brush Island, off Bawley Point
 Cabbage Tree Island, at the mouth of Port Stephens
Cabbage Tree Island, in the Richmond River
 Carter's Island, in Botany Bay near the mouth of George's River
 Clarence River estuary:
 Ashby Island
 Chatsworth Island
 Freeburn Island
 Goodwood Island
 Harwood Island
 Micalo Island
 Palmer's Island
 Thorny Island
 Warregah Island
 Yargai Island
 Clark Island, in Sydney Harbour
 Cockatoo Island, in Sydney Harbour, originally used as a prison and later developed as a shipyard
 Comerong Island, in the Shoalhaven River estuary
 Coocumbac Island, in the Manning River at Taree
 Cook Island, located near Tweed Heads
 Crampton Island, off the mouth of Lake Tabourie
 Dalhunty Island, in Wilson River at Telegraph Point
 Dangar Island, a small forested island in the Hawkesbury River
 Darling Island, a former island subsequently bridged by land, in Sydney Harbour
 Elizabeth Island, in the Clarence River near Grafton
 Esk Island, in the north arm of the Clarence River
 Fatima Island, a tidal island of the Cook's River
 Fattorini Island, in the Macleay River near Smithtown
 Fort Denison, also known as Pinchgut
 Five Islands Nature Reserve, a group of islands off the coast of Wollongong:
 Bass Island
 Big Island
 Martin Island
 Red Island
 Tom Thumb Island
 Garden Island (no longer an island)
 Glebe Island (no longer an island)
 Goat Island, a rocky island in Sydney Harbour
 Green Island, a small island north of Smoky Cape
 Green Island, off the mouth of Lake Conjola
 Hexham Island, in the lower Hunter River
 Honeysuckle Island, in Wallaga Lake
 Horse Island, in Tuross Lake
 Joass Island, located in Little Swan Bay, Port Stephens
 Kurrajong Island, in the Shoalhaven estuary
 Lake Illawarra:
 Berageree Island
 Bevan's Island
 Gooseberry Island
 Hooka Island
 Picnic Island
 Cudgeree Island
 Kooragang Island, in the lower Hunter River
 Lake Eucumbene:
 Grace Lea Island
 Hallstrom Island
 Heron Island
 Teal Island
 Lion Island, in Broken Bay
 Little Rawdon Island, in Hastings River downstream of Wauchope
 Long Island, in the Hawkesbury River
 Ball's Pyramid
 Admiralty Group
 Manning River estuary:
 Cabbage Tree Island
 Dumaresq Island
 Mitchell's Island
 Oxley Island
 Merriman Island, in Wallaga Lake
 Milson Island, in the Hawkesbury River
 Moon Island, 1 km off Swansea Heads
 Muttonbird Island, off Coffs Harbour
 Newry Island, in the Kalang River near Urunga
 Numbaa Island, in the Shoalhaven River
 Payne's Island, in Wallaga Lake
 Peat Island, in the Hawkesbury River
 Pig Island, in the Shoalhaven River
 Pimlico Island, in Richmond River near Wardell
Pinchgut - see Fort Denison, a former penal site and defensive facility in Sydney Harbour
 Pulbah Island, the largest island in Lake Macquarie
 Rawdon Island, in Hastings River downstream of Wauchope
 Reedy Island, in Tuross Lake
 Regatta Island, in Wallis Lake
 Rodd Island, a small island in Iron Cove, an arm of Port Jackson (Sydney Harbour)
 Sanctuary Island, in Narrabeen Lagoon
 Scotland Island, in Pittwater
 Shark Island, in Sydney Harbour
 Snapper Island, in Sydney Harbour
 Spectacle Island, in the Hawkesbury River
 Spectacle Island, in Sydney Harbour 
 Solitary Islands
 North Solitary Island
 South Solitary Island
 Southwest Solitary Island
 Mid Solitary Island
 Split Solitary Island
 Stott's Island, in Tweed River at Tumbuulgum
 Stuart's Island, in Nambucca River at Bellwood
 Sultan's Island off coast 4 km north of Eden
 Susan Island, in Clarence River at Grafton
 Teribah Island, at The Entrance, Tuggerah Lake
 Tollgate Islands (2), in Bateman's Bay
 Ukerebagh Island, in Tweed River at South Tweed Heads
 Wallis Island, in Wallis Lake
 Wasp Island, the only island in Durras Inlet near Batemans Bay
 Wedding Cake Island,  a small island off the coast of Coogee
 Windang Island, a small island at the entrance to Lake Illawarra
 Woodford Island, in the Clarence River immediately upstream of Maclean
 Yellow Rock Island, at junction of Bellinger and Kalang Rivers near Urunga

Northern Territory

 Bathurst Island
 Bickerton Island
 Bruney Island
 Crocodile Islands
 Croker Island
 East Woody Island
 Elcho Island
 Goulburn Islands
 Groote Eylandt - The name is an archaic spelling of the Dutch words for "Big Island" - Australia's 4th largest island
 Howard Island
 Inglis Island
 Marchinbar Island
 Martjanba Island 
 Melville Island, the second largest island in Australia
 Quail Island
 Sir Edward Pellew Group
 Tiwi Islands
 Vanderlin Island
 Wessel Islands

Queensland

 Acheron Island
 Agnes Island
 Albino Rock
 Aplin Islet
 Arnold Islets
 Avoid Island
 Baird Island
 Barber Island
 Barrow Island
Bayley Island
 Bedarra Island
 Beesley Island
 Bentinck Island
 Bird Islands
 Bishop Island
 Bootie Island
 Bountiful Islands
 Bowden Island
 Boyne Island
 Brampton Island
 Bribie Island
 Brisk Island
 Brook Islands, three islands: North, Tween and Middle.
 Bourke Isles
 Bushy Island
 Bushy Islet
 Cholmondeley Islet
 Clack Island
 Clerke Island
 Coconut Island
 Coochiemudlo Island
 Crab Island
 Cordelia Rocks
 Coquet Island
 Curacoa Island
 Denham Island, Cape York Peninsula
 Denham Island, Wellesley Islands
 Douglas Islet
 Duncan Islands
 Dunk Island
 Eagle Island
 Ellis Island
 Ephraim Island
 Esk Island
 Eclipse Island
 Fantome Island
 Falcon Island
 Fisher Island
 Fisherman Island
 Fitzroy Island
 Fly Island
 Frankland Islands
 Russell Island
 K'gari, the largest sand island in the world 
 Goold Island
 Gore Island
 Great Keppel Island
 Great Palm Island
 Green Island
 Haggerston Island
 Hales Island
 Hannibal Islands
 Harvey Island
 Heron Island
 High Island
 Hinchinbrook Island
 Horseshoe Island
 Houghton Island
 Hudson Island
 Jessie Island
 Kangaroo Island
 Kent Island
 King Island
 Kumboola Island
 Lady Elliot Island
 Lady Musgrave Island
 Leggatt Island
 Lindquist Island
 Lizard Island
 Lloyd Island
 Low Island
 Low Wooded Island
 Mabel Island
 Makepeace Island
 Magnetic Island
 Milman Islet
 Moreton Island
 Mornington Island
 Morris Island
 Mudjimba Island
 Murdock Island
 Nigger Head
 Newton Island
 Nob Island
 Noble Island
 Normanby Island
 North Direction Island
 North Stradbroke Island
 Northumberland Islands
 Bedwell Group
 Beverley Group
 Broad Sound Islands
 Duke Islands
 Flat Isles
 Guardfish Cluster
 Percy Isles
 Orpheus Island
 Paddy Island
 Pains Island
 Palfrey Island
 Peel Island
 Pelorus Island
 Pentecost Island
 Percy Island
 Perry Island
 Pigeon Island
 Pincushion Island
 Pipon Island
 Prince of Wales Island
 Pumpkin Island
 Raine Island
 Restoration Island
 Rocky Island
 Rocky Point Island
 Rodney Island
 Round Island
 St Helena Island
 Shaw Island
 Sherrard Island
 Sir Charles Hardy Islands
 The Sisters
 Sisters Islands
 Snapper Island
 South Direction Island
 South Stradbroke Island
 Southern Moreton Bay Islands
 Russell Island
 Macleay Island
 Perulpa Island (connected to Macleay Island by causeway) 
 Lamb Island
 Karragarra Island
 Saibai Island, in the Torres Strait
 Stephens Island
 Struck Island
 Sunday Island
 Sunter Island
 Sweers Island
 Talbot Islands
 Tern Island
 Thomson Islet
 Thorpe Island
 Three Islands
 The Three Sisters
 Sue Islet
 Torres Strait Islands
 Trochus Island
 Turtle Group
 Watson Island
 Wellesley Islands
North Wellesley Islands (Mornington, Moondalbee, Lingnoonganee, Pisonia, Lingeleah, Beahgoo, Jinke, Sydney, Tulburrerr, Denham, and Andrew Islands)
South Wellesley Islands (Allen, Horseshoe,  Albinia,  Bentinck,  Fowler,  and Sweers Islands)
West Wellesley Islands (Forsyth, Ivis, Pains,  and Bayley Islands)
 Wheeler Island
 Whitsunday Islands
 Daydream Island
 Dent Island
 Hamilton Island
 Hayman Island
 Hook Island
 Keswick Island
 Lindeman Island
 Long Island
 South Molle Island
 Whitsunday Island
 Wilson Island

 Woody Island

South Australia

Ocean islands

 Althorpe Islands
 Haystack Island
 Seal Island (Investigator Strait)
 Beatrice Islets
 Bicker Isles
 Bird Islands
 Boston Island
 Busby Islet
 Casuarina Islets
 Chinamans Hat Island
 Curlew Island
 Douglas Rock
 Entrance Island
 Gambier Islands
Garden Island
 Goose Island
 Granite Island
 Grantham Island
 Greenly Island
 Grindal Island
 Investigator Group
 Flinders Island
 Pearson Isles
 Dorothee Island
 Pearson Island
 Veteran Isles
 Topgallant Islands
 Waldegrave Islands
 Ward Islands
 Jones Island
 Kangaroo Island, Australia's third-largest island 
 Liguanea Island 
 Lipson Island 
 Louth Island 
 Neptune Islands 
 Nicolas Baudin Island 
 Nobby Islet 
 Nuyts Archipelago 
 St Francis Island
 St Peter Island
 Smooth Island
 Middle Island 
 Owen Island
 Paisley Islet
 Pelorus Islet
 Pullen Island
 Rabbit Island, Coffin Bay
 Rabbit Island, Louth Bay
 Rabbit Islet, Pelican Lagoon
 Royston Island
 St Francis Island
 St Peter Island
 Shag Island
 Sir Joseph Banks Group
 Blyth Island
 Boucaut Island
 Dalby Island
Dangerous Reef
 Duffield Island
 English Island
 Hareby Island
 Kirkby Island
 Langton Island
 Lusby Island
 Marum Island
 Partney Island
 Reevesby Island
 Roxby Island
 Seal Rock
 Sibsey Island
 Spilsby Island
 Stickney Island
 Winceby Island
 Seal Island (Encounter Bay)
 South Island
 Taylor Island
 Thistle Island
 Torrens Island
 Troubridge Island
 Tumby Island
Unnamed island, Baird Bay
 Wardang Island
 Wedge Island
 Weeroona Island
 West Island
 Wright Island

Murray River islands 

 Hindmarsh Island
 Mundoo Island
 Pomanda Island
 Rabbit Island, Coorong

Tasmania

Tasmania is a large island state off the south-east coast of mainland Australia. The main island of Tasmania (which includes 94% of the state's land area) does not have a defined name but can be referred to as the "Tasmanian mainland". A full list of all 334 islands is located at the list of islands of Tasmania.

 Bruny Island
Furneaux Island Group
Anderson Island
Babel Island
Badger Island
Big Green Island
Cape Barren Island
Clarke Island
East Kangaroo Island
Flinders Island
Goose Island
Great Dog Island
Long Island
Mount Chappell Island
 Hogan Island
 Hunter Island Group
 Hunter Island
 Robbins Island
 Three Hummock Island
 Kent Island Group
Deal Island
Dover Island
Erith Island
 King Island
 Maatsuyker Islands Group
 Chicken Island
 De Witt Island
 Maatsuyker Island
 Macquarie Island
 Maria Island
 Ile du Nord
 Partridge Island
 Petrel Island Group
 Big Sandy Petrel Island
 Big Stony Petrel Island
 Little Stony Petrel Island
 South West Petrel Island
 Kangaroo Island
 Howie Island
 Picnic Island
 Robbins Island
Walker Island (northwest)
 Rodondo Island
 Schouten Island
 Sloping Island Group
 Sloping Island
 Smooth Island (Tasmania)
Waterhouse Island Group
Swan Island
 Waterhouse Island

Victoria

 Anser Island
 Barrallier Island
 Bennison Island
 Chinaman Island
 Churchill Island
 Corner Island
 Duck Island
 Elizabeth Island
 French Island
 Gabo Island
 Griffiths Island
 Joe Island
 Kanowna Island
 Lady Julia Percy Island
 Mud Islands
 Norman Island
 Phillip Island
 Raymond Island
 Rotamah Island
 Sandstone Island
 Shellback Island
 Snake Island
 Sunday Island
 Swan Island
 Tullaberga Island
 Mangrove Islet

River islands
 Beveridge Island
 Coode Island
 Gunbower Island
 Herring Island
 Jordan's Island
 Pental Island

Western Australia

Over 1,000 islands have been gazetted – only the island groups and major islands are listed.

 Ashmore Reef
 Barrow Island
 Bonaparte Archipelago
 Buccaneer Archipelago
 Cockatoo Island
 Cape Leeuwin Islands
 Carnac Island
 Dampier Archipelago
 Dirk Hartog Island
 Garden Island
 Houtman Abrolhos
 Easter Group
 Pelsaert Group
 Wallabi Group
 Lacepede Islands
 Lowendal Islands
 Mary Anne Group
 Montebello Islands
 Recherché Archipelago
 Rottnest Island
 Rowley Shoals
 Scott and Seringapatam Reefs
 Shark Bay islands
 Wedge Island

Australian territories

Jervis Bay Territory
 Bowen Island

Australian Capital Territory
 Kingston Island
 Pine Island
 Queen Elizabeth II Island
 Spinnaker Island
 Springbank Island

External territories

 Ashmore and Cartier Islands
 Australian Antarctic Territory
 Achernar Island
 Masson Island
 Hawker Island
 Frazier Islands
 Giganteus Island
 Christmas Island
 Cocos (Keeling) Islands
 Horsburgh Island
 Home Island
 North Keeling Island
 West Island
 Coral Sea Islands
Cato Island
 Elizabeth Reef
 Middleton Reef
 Willis Island
 Heard Island and McDonald Islands
 Norfolk Island
 Nepean Island
 Phillip Island

See also

 List of islands
 List of islands in the Pacific Ocean
 List of islands in the Indian Ocean
 List of islands of Asia
 List of Torres Strait Islands

References

Australia, Lists of islands of
 
Lists of islands by continent